Mark Twain is a crater on Mercury. Its name was adopted by the International Astronomical Union (IAU) in 1976. Mark Twain is named for the American author Mark Twain, who lived from 1835 to 1910.

Mark Twain is one of 110 peak ring basins on Mercury.

References

Impact craters on Mercury
Mark Twain